The 1996–97 Pilkington Cup was the 26th edition of England's premier rugby union club competition. Leicester won the competition defeating Sale in the final. The event was sponsored by Pilkington and the final was held at Twickenham Stadium.

Draw and results

First round (Sep 14)

Second round (Oct 12)

Progressed to next round by virtue of scoring more tries*

Third round (Nov 2)

Fourth round (Dec 21 & 22)

Fifth round (Jan 25 & 26)

Quarter-finals (Feb 22 & 23)

Semi-finals (Mar 29)

Final

References

1996-97 
1996–97 rugby union tournaments for clubs
1996–97 in English rugby union